Brad Boston (born 29 August 1974) is a Canadian sailor. He competed in the 1996 Summer Olympics with his teammates Bill Abbott Jr. and Joanne Abbott in the Soling.

References

1974 births
Living people
Canadian male sailors (sport)
North American Champions Soling
Olympic sailors of Canada
Sailors at the 1996 Summer Olympics – Soling
Sailors at the 2000 Summer Olympics – Soling
Sportspeople from Sarnia